Geet – Hui Sabse Parayi is an Indian soap opera  which premiered on 5 April 2010 on STAR One. It is the first series produced by 4 Lions Films. The show ended on 14 December 2011 when STAR One was replaced by Life OK.

Plot
Geet is an innocent village girl of the Handa household. Her family decides to get her married to Dev Khurana, a rich NRI, much to her dismay. Dev is actually married and lives away from his family due to some quarrels with his brother. In order to get money, he marries Geet and abandons her at the airport next day. Hurt, geet returns to her village, finds out about her pregnancy and Dev's truth. She meets Maan Singh Khurana, Dev's brother and they start bickering all the time. When her family asks her to abort the kid, she refuses. They try to kill her but is saved by Maan. She cuts all ties with her family, moves to Delhi for a job and accidentally takes up Maan's secretary's post.
Geet who is unaware of the fact of Mann being Dev's brother and Mann who is unaware of Dev's marriage with Geet, fall in love with each other. Dev and his wife Nayantara, return and starts living with Mann. Though Geet also ends up being there often, they miss each other. Mann was furious to know about Geet's pregnancy but later accepts Geet's baby and they decide to get engaged. Dev and Nayantara find out that Maan's secretary is Geet and try to avoid her. Later they split-up and a guilty Dev goes to Geet and opens up her relationship with Mann. Disheartened Geet breaks the engagement and walks away. Maan learns the truth and gets Dev jailed but later with the help of Geet, bails him out. Geet thinking that Maan used her for bailing Dev, moves away from him but they later reconcile.
Nayanthara tries to kill Geet, but falls from the terrace and slips into coma. Her brother Arjun decides to take revenge and fakes love with Anwesha, Maan's sister and consummates. He later learns Nayantara's evil motives and unites with Anwesha. Geet's brother tries to kill her but she is saved by Maan. They marry but Maan distances from her as she is expecting. Geet falls down and the child is aborted. Later Maan suspects Geet and Dev's closeness which irks Geet and she leaves. They later unite. Geet is abducted by her childhood lover but is saved by Maan. Maan is attacked by Parminder, his step mother after which he loses his memory about Geet. He later remembers her and they unite. The show ends with them becoming parents.

Cast

Main
  Drashti Dhami as Geet Maan Singh Khurana
 Gurmeet Chaudhary as Maan Singh Khurana

Recurring
  Suhasini Mulay/Anju Mahendru as Savitri Khuranna
  Abhinav Shukla/Samir Sharma  as Dev Singh Khurana
  Nikunj Malik as Anwesha Singh Khurana
  Melanie Pais as Nandini Handa
  Tanushree Kaushal/Usma Bachani as Parminder Singh Khurana
  Karishma Randhawa/ Sonali Nikam as Naintara Singh Rathore
  Behzaad Khan as Brij Handa
  Talat Rekhi as Daarji Handa
  Praneet Bhat as Aditya "Adi"
  Aditi Chopra as Pinky
  Kanika Maheshwari as Sasha
  Aakanksha Nimonkar as Tasha
  Perneet Chauhan as Meera
  Jaanvi Sangwan as Beeji
  Prashant Chawla as Teji
  Ahwaan Kumar as Lucky
  Khushbu Thakkar as Preeto Lucky
  Shalini Kapoor Sagar as Rano Handa
  Neelu Kohli as  Rupinder Handa
  Vicky Ahuja as Mohinderlaal Handa
  Manish Naggdev as Gurvinder
  Jay Bhanushali as Yash Malhotra
  Neha Jhulka as Pari
  Piyush Sahdev as Arjun Singh Rathore
  Rumi khan
  Vishal Thakkar as Manav
  Iira Soni as Nitya
  Arjun Pundir as Sangram Gujjar
  Vikas Sethi as Vikram

References

External links

Indian television soap operas
Serial drama television series
2010 Indian television series debuts
2011 Indian television series endings
Television shows set in Delhi
Television shows set in Punjab, India
Television series by 4 Lions Films
Star One (Indian TV channel) original programming